The Arcadia Sawmill and Arcadia Cotton Mill (also known as the Arcadia Mill Site or Escambia Manufacturing Company) is a historic site a mile southwest of Milton, Florida, United States. On August 3, 1987, it was added to the U.S. National Register of Historic Places.

The remains of the early 19th century industrial water-powered mill complex are now part of the Arcadia Mill Archaeological Site, which is managed by the West Florida Historic Preservation.  There is a visitor center and museum with exhibits about the site, and an elevated boardwalk through the archaeological remains of the complex and adjacent swamp.

The West Florida Historic Preservation, part of the University of West Florida, also manages Historic Pensacola Village, the T.T. Wentworth, Jr. Florida State Museum, and the Pensacola Historical Society.

References

External links
 Arcadia Mill Archaeological Site - official site
 Santa Rosa County listings at National Register of Historic Places
 Santa Rosa County listings at Florida's Office of Cultural and Historical Programs
 History and photos of Arcadia Mill site

National Register of Historic Places in Santa Rosa County, Florida
Museums in Santa Rosa County, Florida
Archaeological museums in Florida
History museums in Florida
Protected areas of Santa Rosa County, Florida
Sawmills in the United States
Cotton mills in the United States
Industry museums in Florida